Beijing beer is a locally produced alcoholic beverage for Beijing, China, by Asahi Breweries. The logo is a graphical representation of the Temple of Heaven with Beijing in Chinese characters (北京) written underneath in a joined up fashion. It is possible to purchase in most convenient stores, particularly 7-Eleven, supermarkets and restaurants although not as widespread as China's two most popular beers, Tsingtao Beer and Yanjing Beer. Draft beer is available in restaurants, while three different types are available in either  cans or  brown bottles for purchase.

Different types of flavors
"Light" - Green writing on a white can (9°)
"Standard" - Blue writing on a silver can (10°)
"Gold" - Black writing on a gold can (11°)

Translated restaurant menus can sometimes appear confusing because the "Yanjing" of Yanjing beer, is the old name for Beijing and is sometimes translated as such. So when ordering a "Beijing beer" a customer might not be receiving the Beijing beer produced by Asahi.

Notes

References 
About Asahi Breweries Group
Xinhua / english.eastday.com
China Business, Dec 2005 (Asia Pulse/XIC)

Business China, Volume 21By Business International Asia/Pacific Ltd
www.beijingbeer.com.cn/ Beijing Beer official website

Beer in China
Chinese alcoholic drinks